The 2004 London–Sydney Marathon was the fifth running of the London–Sydney Marathon. The rally took place between 5 June and 4 July 2004. The event covered 9,300 miles (15,000 km) through Europe, Asia and Australia. It was won by Joe McAndrew and Murray Cole in a Honda Integra Type-R.

Background
In 2004, Nick Brittan and his company, Trans World Events, who had organise long-distance endurance rallies for the last decade including the last two London–Sydney Marathons in 1993 and in 2000 decided to organise another London-Sydney Marathon but this time featuring pre-1978 classic cars and modern FIA Group N showroom cars, limited to two wheel drive and naturally aspirated engines up to 2000cc. The route would see competitors cross Europe in the first twelve days of the event before the cars would be airlifted by the Antonov An-124 cargo planes hired by TWE from Turkey to India with competitors driving through India for the next eight days before being airlifted to Australia for the last ten days of the rally.

Results

References

Rally raid races
Rally racing series
London-Sydney Marathon